The Bauhaus Archive is a state archive and Museum of Design located in Berlin. It collects art pieces, items, documents and literature which relate to the Bauhaus School (1919–1933), and puts them on public display. Currently, the museum is closed due to construction works and will reopen in 2022. It has a temporary space at Knesbeckstr. 1–2 in Berlin-Charlottenburg.

History 

The Bauhaus Archive was founded in Darmstadt in 1960. Walter Gropius and other members of the Bauhaus movement gave their support. The collection grew so quickly that a dedicated museum seemed attractive and Gropius was asked to design it. In 1964, he produced plans for a new museum in Darmstadt, on the Rosenhöhe, which was prevented by local politics.

The Senate of Berlin was however ready to supply both space and money for the project. In 1971 the Bauhaus Archive moved to temporary accommodation in Berlin. Modifying the plans for the location beside the Landwehrkanal, political decisions and financial restrictions delayed things. The foundation stone was finally laid in 1976 and the building was ready by 1979. There is not that much left of Gropius' original 1964 design apart from the characteristic silhouette of the shed roofs. The necessary changes to the plan were carried out by his former colleague Alex Cvijanović, in conjunction with the Berlin architect Hans Bandel.

In 1997 a conservation order was placed on the building. In 2005 it served as an outdoor set for the science fiction action films V for Vendetta and Æon Flux.

As space only permits exhibition of 35 percent of the museum's holdings, the Bauhaus Archive invited six architectural firms to participate in a co-operative competition: Diener & Diener (Basle), Nägeli Architekten (Berlin), SANAA (Tokyo), Sauerbruch & Hutton (Berlin), UN Studio (Amsterdam), Volker Staab (Berlin). In 2005, the jury chaired by Wolfgang Lorch (Saarbrücken) awarded first prize to the design of Japanese firm SANAA. In 2009, the Berlin Senate abandoned the extension plans.

Collection 
The collection documents the history of Bauhaus in art, teaching, architecture and design. The collection includes teaching materials, workshop models, architectural plans and models, photographs, documents and a library.

The Bauhaus archive looks after works by Lyonel Feininger, Johannes Itten, Paul Klee, Wassily Kandinsky, László Moholy-Nagy, Werner Drewes, Gunta Stölzl and Oskar Schlemmer. The comprehensive graphic collection includes drawings, watercolours and prints.

Activities 
Apart from the permanent exhibition, each year there are about four special exhibitions. There are also lectures, workshops and discussions, exhibitions in the sculpture yard, readings and concerts. The Bauhaus Archive in Berlin has long held the only official Bauhaus trademark label to reproduce a limited number of Bauhaus designs.

References

External links

 Official archive website
 Official audio guide

Bauhaus
Buildings and structures in Berlin
Archives in Germany
Art museums and galleries in Berlin
Design museums
Art museums established in 1960
1960 establishments in Germany
Buildings and structures in Mitte